Aaron W. Hughes is a Canadian-British academic, author, and professor of Religious studies. He holds the Dean's Professor of the Humanities and the Philip S. Bernstein Professor of Religious Studies in the Department of Religion and Classics at the University of Rochester. Previously, he was the Gordon and Gretchen Gross Professor of Jewish Studies at the University at Buffalo, State University of New York from 2009 to 2012, and, from 2001 to 2009, Professor of Religious Studies at the University of Calgary in Alberta, Canada.

Biography
The first-born son of William Hughes (1927–2013) and Sadie Alley (1936– ), Aaron was born on August 15, 1968, at the University Hospital in Edmonton, AB. His father was a native of Glasgow, Scotland and his mother was born in Fort Simpson, NWT, daughter to Bud and Lottie Mabelle (May) Alley. He also has a young brother, Cameron (1972– ). A first-generation college student, Hughes received a B.A. (hons) in Religious studies at the University of Alberta in 1993. He worked primarily there with Earle H. Waugh, Ehud Ben Zvi, and Francis Landy. Following this, he went to the Department of Religious Studies at Indiana University in Bloomington, where he received a M.A. in 1995 and a Ph.D. in 2000 for a dissertation entitled Philosophy's Mythos: Aesthetics, the Imagination, and the Philosophical Novel on Medieval Jewish and Islamic Thought. This was subsequently published as The Texture of the Divine: Imagination in Medieval Islamic and Jewish Thought (Indiana University Press, 2004), which was one of three finalists for a Koret Jewish Book Award in the Thought/Philosophy category. In addition to his coursework at Indiana University, Hughes also spent a year, 1996-1997, at the Hebrew University in Jerusalem and then later as a Lady Davis fellow in 2004-2005. He also spent several years at the University of Oxford, in 1999-2000 and then again in 2019-2020, at the Faculty of Oriental Studies.

Work
Hughes is a scholar of three distinct, yet interrelated, fields of research: Jewish studies, Islamic studies, and Theory and Method in the Academic Study of Religion. What connects these diverse areas, for Hughes, is the meta questions that govern scholarly production. Working on the assumption that scholarly categories are not natural, but products of often highly idiosyncratic, political, and ideological choice, Hughes seeks to critique such motivations. This is seen in his dismantling of the category "Abrahamic religions." It is also visible in his critiques of the subfields of Islamic and Jewish studies.

In terms of Islamic Studies, Hughes has primarily been interested in critiquing what he regards as the overly apologetical and ecumenical approach to the field. This can be witnessed, for example in his two books that take aim at the field (Situating Islam and Theorizing Islam). However rather than just critique, Hughes has also attempted a corrective with his Muslim Identities, which is meant to be an attempt to provide an introduction to Islam in ways that eschews the approaches of scholars like Fred Denny and John Esposito. Writing in the Journal of Islamic Studies, Murad Wilfried Hofmann describes Hughes' Muslim Identities as "the very best introduction currently available in English for non-Muslims seeking a sound approach to Islam." However, writing in the Review of Middle East Studies, while Peter Matthews Wright described the book as a worthy introduction, he criticized the author's uneven tone and reversion to language that undermines Hughe's stated aims.

Hughes is also the co-editor of Method and Theory in the Study of Religion (MTSR), the leading journal devoted to the subject. In addition, he was the Editor of the Academy Series, published by Oxford University Press for the American Academy of Religion, and co-editor for the Library of Contemporary Jewish Philosophers.

Canadian Studies
forthcoming

Public dispute with Omid Safi
In the 2012 book Theorizing Islam, Hughes had written critically about the scholarship of Omid Safi, a professor of Islamic studies at the University of North Carolina at Chapel Hill, and other scholars in the academic study of Islam. In January 2014, Safi published a piece on the ezine Jadaliyya presenting his "impressions about the state of Islamic studies in the North American academy." In the course of the article, in which he expressed his concern regarding unreconstructed orthodox Muslim voices entering the American academy, he stated that Hughes and two other scholars had written "pieces attacking and critiquing the prominence of Muslim scholars in the Study of Islam Section." Specifically, he described Hughes book as "grossly polemical and simplistic." In response, Hughes demanded that he "do what the Western tradition of scholarly discourse demands and respond to my ideas in print as opposed to engaging in innuendo and identity politics." He further suggested that Safi may have been motivated by Hughes' position in Jewish studies, adding sarcastically, "[w]e all know that Jews are the arch-enemy of Islam."

Books

Written by Hughes
The Charter of Rights and Freedoms: A Biography. Edmonton: University of Alberta Press, under contract (expected, 2024).
Muslim Identities: An Introduction to Islam. 2nd ed. Sheffield: Equinox, 2022.
10 Days That Shaped Modern Canada. Edmonton: University of Alberta Press, 2022.
An Anxious Inheritance: Religious Others and the Shaping of Sunnī Orthodoxy. Oxford: Oxford University Press, 2022.
Religion in 50 More Words: A Critical Vocabulary (with Russell T. McCutcheon). London: Routledge, 2022.
Religion in 50 Words: A Critical Vocabulary (with Russell T. McCutcheon). London: Routledge, 2022.
Somewhere Between Islam and Judaism: Critical Reflections. Sheffield: Equinox, 2021.
From Seminary to University: An Institutional History of the Study of Religion in Canada. Toronto: University of Toronto Press, 2020.
Muslim and Jew: Origins, Growth, Resentment. London: Routledge, 2019.
Shared Identities: Medieval and Modern Imaginings of Judeo-Islam. Oxford and New York: Oxford University Press, 2017.
Comparison: A Critical Primer. Sheffield: Equinox, 2017.
Jacob Neusner: An American Jewish Iconoclast. New York: New York University Press, 2016.
Jacob Neusner on Religion: The Example of Judaism. New York and London: Routledge. 2016.
Islam and the Tyranny of Authenticity: An Inquiry into Disciplinary Apologetics and Self-Deception. Sheffield: Equinox, 2015.
Rethinking Jewish Philosophy: Beyond Particularism and Universalism. New York and Oxford: Oxford University Press, 2014.
The Study of Judaism: Identity, Authenticity, Scholarship.  Albany, NY: State University of New York Press, 2013.
Muslim Identities: An Introduction.  New York, NY: Columbia University Press, 2013.
Abrahamic Religions: On the Uses and Abuses of History.  New York and Oxford: Oxford University Press, 2012.
Theorizing Islam: Disciplinary Deconstruction and Reconstruction.  London: Equinox, 2012.
The Invention of Jewish Identity: Bible, Philosophy, and the Art of Translation.  Bloomington: Indiana University Press, 2010.
 Situating Islam; The Past and Future of an Academic Discipline.  Equinox Publishing, 2008.
 The Art of Dialogue in Jewish Philosophy. Bloomington: Indiana University Press, 2007.
 Jewish Philosophy A-Z.  Edinburgh UP, 2005.
 The Texture of the Divine: Imagination in Medieval Islamic and Jewish Thought (Indiana UP 2004)

Edited by Hughes
New Methods in the Study of Islam (with Abbas Aghdassi). Edinburgh: Edinburgh University Press, 2022.
What Is Religion?: Debating the Academic Study of Religion (with Russell T. McCutcheon). Oxford: Oxford University Press, 2021.
Deconstructing Islamic Studies (with Majid Daneshgar). Cambridge, MA: Harvard University Press, 2020.
Medieval Jewish Philosophy and Its Literary Forms (with James T. Robinson). Bloomington: Indiana University Press, 2019.
The Future of Jewish Philosophy (with Hava Tirosh-Samuelson). Leiden: Brill, 2018.
Library of Contemporary Jewish Philosophy (with Hava Tirosh-Samuelson). 20 vols. Leiden: Brill, 2018.
Religion in Five Minutes (with Russell T. McCutcheon). Sheffield: Equinox, 2017.
Theory in a Time of Excess: Beyond Reflection and Explanation in Religious Studies Scholarship. Sheffield: Equinox, 2017.
Poets, Prophets, and Texts in Play: Studies in Biblical Poetry and Prophecy in Honor of Francis Landy (with Ehud Ben Zvi, Claudia V. Camp, David M. Gunn.  London: T & T Clark, 2014.
Jewish Philosophy for the Twenty-First Century: Personal Reflections (with Hava Tirosh-Samuelson".  Leiden: Brill, 2014.
Theory and Method in the Study of Religion: Twenty-Five Years On. Leiden: Brill, 2013.
Encountering the Medieval in Modern Jewish Thought (with James A. Diamond).  Leiden: Brill, 2012.
New Directions in Jewish Philosophy (with Elliot R. Wolfson). Indiana University Press, 2009.
 Defining Judaism: A Reader.  Equinox Publishing, 2009.
Guest editor of two special issues of the Journal of Jewish Thought and Philosophy (JJTP).

Honors and awards
Fulbright Distinguished Research Chair in Canada and North America, College of the Humanities, Carleton University, Ottawa, ON, 2022-2023

National Endowment for the Humanities (NEH), Fellowship, 2019-2020

Bluma Appel Visiting Scholar in Jewish Studies, Dept. of Religious Studies, University of California, Santa Barbara, Spring 2016

Katz Center for Advanced Jewish Studies (declined), University of Pennsylvania, Fall 2015

Bernard and Audre Rapoport Fellow, American Jewish Archives Hebrew Union College-Jewish Institute of Religion, Cincinnati, OH, 2014

Schreiber Visiting Professor of Jewish Studies, McMaster University, Winter 2008

Social Science and Humanities Research Council of Canada (SSHRC), Standard Research Grant, 2008–2011

Fellow, Calgary Institute of the Humanities, University of Calgary, 2008–2009

Schreiber Visiting Professor of Jewish Studies, McMaster University, Winter 2008

Killam Residential Fellowship, University of Calgary, Fall 2007

Lady Davis Fellowship, Hebrew University of Jerusalem, 2004–2005

Social Science and Humanities Research Council of Canada (SSHRC), Standard Research Grant, 2004-2007.

Ruth and Mark Luckens Prize in Jewish Thought, University of Kentucky, 2004

External links
Interviews

 With Craig Martin, Bulletin for the Study of Religion.
 With Matt Sheedy, Bulletin for the Study of Religion.

References

 Reference 1 http://www.myjewishbooks.com/awards04.html

1968 births
Living people
Canadian historians of religion
Canadian people of Scottish descent
Religious studies scholars
Historians of Jews and Judaism
Academic staff of the University of Calgary
University at Buffalo faculty
Historians of Islam